Chandragiri Assembly constituency is a constituency of Andhra Pradesh Legislative Assembly, India. It is one among 7 constituencies in Tirupati district.

Chevireddy Bhaskar Reddy of Yuvajana Sramika Rythu Congress Party is currently representing the constituency.

Overview
It is part of the Chittoor Lok Sabha constituency along with another six Vidhan Sabha segments, namely, Gangadhara Nellore (SC), Chittoor, Puthalapattu (SC), Palamaner, Kuppam, and Nagari.

Mandals
Chandragiri Assembly constituency consists of Seven Mandals.

Members of Legislative Assembly
Election results are as follows:

Election results

1952

Assembly Elections 1983

Assembly Elections 2004

Assembly Elections 2009

Assembly elections 2014

Assembly elections 2019

See also
 List of constituencies of Andhra Pradesh Vidhan Sabha

References

Assembly constituencies of Andhra Pradesh